Delta is the fourth full-length album by Austrian symphonic power metal band Visions of Atlantis featuring the new vocalist Maxi Nil. It was released on 25 February 2011.

Reception 

The reviewers of Jukebox Metal and Sonic Seducer agreed that new singer Maxi Nil did not reach the musical quality of her predecessor. However, the album was called a solid release and was compared to the style of Edenbridge and Epica. The German edition of Metal Hammer marked that the contrast between female voices and male growling that is typical for the genre was rather absent on this album, and wrote that Delta featured straight rock hymns instead. Their reviewer and James Donovan of Jukebox Metal found the style to be remiscent of Kamelot.

Track listing

References 

2011 albums
Visions of Atlantis albums
Napalm Records albums